Muringur Vadakkummuri  is a village in Thrissur district in the state of Kerala, India.

Demographics

 India census, Muringur Vadakkummuri had a population of 5175 with 2499 males and 2676 females.

References

Villages in Thrissur district